Nada Birko (2 January 1931 – 1 September 2020) was a Croatian cross-country skier who competed for Yugoslavia during the 1950s.
She finished 14th in the 10 km event at the 1952 Winter Olympics in Oslo. She was born in Mrkopalj, and died in Zagreb, aged 90. At the time of her death she was the oldest Croatian Olympian.

References

External links
Yugoslavia's 1952 Winter Olympics results

Olympic cross-country skiers of Yugoslavia
Cross-country skiers at the 1952 Winter Olympics
Cross-country skiers at the 1956 Winter Olympics
2020 deaths
1931 births
Yugoslav female cross-country skiers
Croatian female cross-country skiers